In linguistics, a tenuis consonant ( or ) is an obstruent that is voiceless, unaspirated and unglottalized.

For most languages, the distinction is relevant only for stops and affricates. However, a few languages have analogous series for fricatives. Mazahua, for example, has ejective, aspirated, and voiced fricatives  alongside tenuis , parallel to stops  alongside tenuis .

Many click languages have tenuis click consonants alongside voiced, aspirated, and glottalized series.

Transcription
However, aspiration is often left untranscribed if no contrast needs to be made, like in English, so there is an explicit diacritic for a lack of aspiration in the extensions to the IPA, a superscript equal sign: . It is sometimes seen in phonetic descriptions of languages. There are also languages, such as the Northern Ryukyuan languages, whose phonologically-unmarked sound is aspirated, and the tenuis consonants are marked and transcribed explicitly.

An early IPA convention was to write the tenuis stops  etc. if the plain letters  were used for aspirated consonants (as they are in English):  'pie' vs.  'spy'.

Etymology
The term tenuis comes from Latin translations of Ancient Greek grammar, which differentiated three series of consonants, voiced β δ γ , aspirate φ θ χ , and tenuis π τ κ . Analogous series occur in many other languages. The term was widely used in 19th-century philology but became uncommon in the 20th.

See also
Grassmann's law
Spiritus asper
Spiritus lenis

Sources

 Bussmann, 1996. Routledge Dictionary of Language and Linguistics
 R.L. Trask, 1996. A Dictionary of Phonetics and Phonology.

References

Phonetics